Vilani may refer to

Vilani Nabukeera, ugandan Musician
Viļāni, Latvia
Aliona Vilani, Russian dancer
Zul Vilani, Indian actor
Vilani (Traveller), fictional aliens in Traveller

See also

 Villani